Mwema(Tarime) is a ward in Tarime District, Mara Region of northern Tanzania, East Africa. In 2016 the Tanzania National Bureau of Statistics report there were 11,260 people in the ward, from 10,204 in 2012.

Villages / neighborhoods 
The ward has 4 villages and 19 hamlets.

 Korotambe
 Kokeregeya
 Mwema
 Nyabichune
 Nyamusi
 Senta
 Wakulima
 Nyakangara
 Gwikongore
 Nchoke
 Renyankomo
 Nyamohonda
 Ibokoho
 Kokebabe
 Kwigenge
 Nyambega
 Nyamohonda
 Kubiterere
 Mlimani
 Nyakunguru
 Nyambache
 Nyansine
 Senta

References

Tarime District
Mara Region